Onstad is a Norwegian surname. Notable people with the surname include:

Chris Onstad (born 1975), American writer, cartoonist, and artist 
Erik Gjems-Onstad (1922-2011), Norwegian resistance member, lawyer, and politician  
Kari Onstad (born 1941), Norwegian singer and actress
Katrina Onstad, Canadian critically acclaimed journalist and novelist
Kenton Onstad (born 1953), American politician, member of the North Dakota House of Representatives
Kristian Flittie Onstad (born 1984), Norwegian professional footballer defender
Mike Ohnstad (1926), Minnesota politician
Niels Onstad (1909–1978), Norwegian shipping executive
Ole Gjems-Onstad (born 1950), Norwegian jurist 
Otto Onstad (1874–1961), American politician
Pat Onstad (born 1968), Canadian professional soccer goalkeeper

See also
Onstad Township, Minnesota, municipality in the State of Minnesota
Henie-Onstad Art Centre, art museum in Oslo, Norway

Norwegian-language surnames